Oberlangen is a municipality in district (Landkreis) Emsland, Lower Saxony (Niedersachsen), north-western Germany.

This was the location of the Prisoner-of-war camp Stalag VI-C. There is a cemetery with mass graves of Soviet prisoners, and individual graves of Polish and Italian prisoners.

See also
 Stalag VI-C

References

External links
 The Memorial of Esterwegen - The Emsland Camps
 About Stalag VI-C in German

Emsland